In Wealden, the largest of six local government districts in the English county of East Sussex, there are 50 former churches, chapels and places of worship which are now used for other purposes or are disused.  The mostly rural district, with five towns and multiple villages, has a 1,200-year documented history of Christian worship—a Saxon leader founded a church at Rotherfield in 790—and by the 19th century nearly every settlement had at least one church, as formerly extensive parishes were split up.  Some have since fallen out of use because of changing patterns of population or declining attendance, or because they have been superseded by other churches.  Protestant Nonconformism, always strong in Sussex, flourished in the area now covered by the district: many Baptist, Methodist and Congregational chapels were built, and although most survive, not all remain in religious use.  The district also has more than 130 current places of worship.

Historic England or its predecessor English Heritage have awarded listed status to more than 60 current and former church buildings in Wealden.  A building is defined as "listed" when it is placed on a statutory register of buildings of "special architectural or historic interest" in accordance with the Planning (Listed Buildings and Conservation Areas) Act 1990.  The Department for Culture, Media and Sport, a Government department, is responsible for this; English Heritage, a non-departmental public body, acts as an agency of the department to administer the process and advise the department on relevant issues.  There are three grades of listing status. Grade I, the highest, is defined as being of "exceptional interest"; Grade II* is used for "particularly important buildings of more than special interest"; and Grade II, the lowest, is used for buildings of "special interest".  As of February 2001, there were 47 Grade I-listed buildings, 106 with Grade II* status and 2,020 Grade II-listed buildings in Wealden.

Wealden and its places of worship

Wealden is at the centre of these: the district of Lewes lies to the west and Rother is to the east.

Wealden's population at the time of the United Kingdom Census 2011 was 148,915.  Five small towns—Crowborough, Hailsham, Heathfield, Polegate and Uckfield—account for about half of these people, and each has several places of worship catering for different denominations.  The rest of the population is spread across dozens of villages and hamlets in the largely rural district.  Many of these settlements have at least one church—often an ancient building on a site where worship has taken place for over a thousand years.  St Wilfrid, exiled to Sussex in the late 7th century, and his near-contemporary St Cuthman rapidly Christianised the county, and the 111 churches described in the Domesday Book of 1086 was a significant underestimate.

Former places of worship

See also

List of current places of worship in Wealden
List of demolished places of worship in East Sussex

Notes

References

Bibliography

Wealden
Wealden
Wealden
Wealden District
Former religious buildings and structures in East Sussex